Giorgi may refer to:

 Giorgi (name), a Georgian masculine given name 
 Giorgi (surname), an Italian surname
 Giorgi family, a noble family of the Republic of Venice and the Republic of Ragusa

See also 

 Giorgio (disambiguation)
 Di Giorgi
 George (disambiguation)
 Zorzi